Harald Feller (born 1951 in Munich) is a German organist, choral conductor and composer teaching at the Hochschule für Musik und Theater München. He was awarded the 1983 Grand Prix du Disque Liszt.

Career 
Feller studied organ at the University of Music and Performing Arts Munich with Franz Lehrndorfer and church music and deepened his studies with Marie-Claire Alain in Paris. Since 1983 he has been professor for organ at the Hochschule für Musik und Theater Munich.

Feller can boast international concert activity and CD and radio recordings. He recorded the organ parts for the film Brother of Sleep.

Awards 
 Stipendium der Studienstiftung des Deutschen Volkes
 Förderpreis für Musik des Bayerischen Staates 
 Grand Prix international du disque Liszt
  (Venice)

Competitions 
 1976: Felix Mottlpreis München
 1978: 
 1979: 3rd prize in the competition of the 
 1983: Improvisation prize in Haarlem (Netherlands)
 2007: Composition Prize for the 100th Anniversary of the Berlin Cathedral.

Compositions 
Organ solo
 Diptychon (Bärenreiter)
 Danse sacrée (Verlag Böhm und Sohn)
 Te Deum for Organ (Schott) 
 Poème funèbre for Organ (Schott) 
 Due pezzi per l’organo
 „Gregorianische Miniaturen“
 „Suite Leonesa“
 Meditationsfantasie (Verlag Böhm und Sohn)
 „Nada“
 4 pieces about BACH
 Fantasy for 2 organs
 For Young Persons Guide to the Organ (Schott)

Organ and other instruments
 Fantasy about a theme by J. Brahms for trumpet and organ (Schott)
 Sonate für Trompete und Orgel
 "Ettaler Sonata" for flute and organ
 "Panta rhei" for percussion and organ
 "Danse macabre" for percussion and organ
 Adagio for cello and organ

Organ and Orchestra
 Concertino festivo for organ, 8 brass instruments and percussion
 Concerto for Organ and Orchestra
 Symphony for Organ and Orchestra

Piano solo
 Die Planeten
 Three piano pieces on Gregorian themes
 Toccata
 Concertino for two pianos
 4 Nocturnes
 Krabat - Suite, Twelve light character pieces based on literary motifs from the novel of the same name by Otfried Preußler
 Ragtime

Cembalo solo
 Toccata 
 Suite
 Un petit concert for 3 Cembali

Chamber music
 Fantasy for trombone quartet (Edition Brand) 
 2 miniatures for oboe, piano, cello and double bass
 Sonata for flute and piano
 Heptameron for flute and piano
 Suite for flute and piano
 Gedanken for flute and piano (harp)
 Fantasy for 13 brass players 
 Variations on an Old English Song for piccolo flute and Marimba
 Mouvements for bassoon, tuba, piano and accordion
 Prière for English horn and string quintet (or Organ)
 5 miniatures for flute solo

Sacred Music
Choir a cappella
 Two Advent motets
 4 Christmas motets for four- to eight-voice mixed choir (Verlag Helbling) 
 Two motets after texts by Hildegard von Bingen (Verlag Helbling)
 Motet based on biblical texts for four-part mixed choir
 "Mantra" for 7-part mixed choir
 22. Psalm for 8-part mixed choir 
 "Missa mundi" for 7-voice mixed choir
 "Missa brevis" for 7-voice mixed choir
 Missa for 4-8-part mixed choir
 "In Nativitate Domini" for 3 male voices
 "Ave Maria" for 8-voice mixed choir
 "Our Father" for 7-voice mixed choir
 "Gott unser Ursprung" (J.Henkys) (Strube-Verlag)
 choral movements after the choral arrangements of Brahms
 carols

Choir with Instruments
 "Missa a 3" three-part mixed choir, flute, string sextet and organ (Verlag Strube)
 "Agnus Dei" for 4-6-part mixed choir, 4 brass instruments and organ
 "Missa canonica" for four-part mixed choir (solos ad lib.), 5 strings and organ
 Missa in Nativitate Domini for Soloists, choir and orchestra
 Feldafinger Messe for 7-part mixed choir, orchestra and organ
 Credo for 4 to 6-part mixed choir, orchestra and organ (own version, for choir and organ)
 Si è congedato (Text: Heinz Grill) Music for a deceased for four-part mixed choir and organ
 3 Spirituals for four-part mixed choir and piano
 Messe brève for soprano solo, three-part women's (children's) choir and organ (Strube)
 Christmas song phrases

Soli with Instruments
 Canti mariani four Marienmotetten for mezzo-soprano, countertenor and orchestra (organ version)
 Requiem for 3 male voices and string sextet
 Michaelshymne (text Heinz Grill) for soprano, harp and organ
 Sonnengesang des St. Franziskus for soprano, mezzo-soprano, baritone and organ (orchestral version with solos and choir)
 Mass 85 for three female voices, organ and harp

Liturgical music
 children's mass (Schott)
 Veni creator for 4-8-part mixed choir, large orchestra, parish singing and organ
 O sacrum convivium for baritone solo, four-part mixed choir, orchestra, organ and parish singing

Oratorical and scenic works
 Tolle lege or the Conversion of Augustin for 4-7-part mixed choir, 8 brass instruments, percussion and organ
 Oberuferer Christgeburtspiel for solos, choir and instruments

Secular choral music
 5 choirs after texts by Christian Morgenstern for 4-part mixed choir
 3 choirs after lyrics by Rilke
 Six German folk songs for eight-part mixed choir

Lieder
 Ave Maria for soprano (tenor) and organ (Schott) 
 Der immerwährende Seelenkalender (Rudolf Steiner) for baritone (Mezzosopran) and piano (Stephan Wunderlich Verlag)
 Lieder after texts by R. Steiner and H. Grill for voice and piano
 Sanskrit song movements for voice and piano (Stephan Wunderlich-Verlag) 
 Psalm 125 for soprano and organ
 7 Christmas Songs for soprano and piano (orchestra)

Adaptations
for organ solo
 Johann Sebastian Bach: Sinfonia for BWV 29 Ratswahlkantate
 Franz Liszt: Von der Wiege bis zum Grabe (Schott)
 Franz Liszt: Notturno No. 3
 Wolfgang Amadeus Mozart: Ouverture 
 Wolfgang Amadeus Mozart: Adagio-Allegro-Adagio
 John Williams: Star-Wars-Suite

Instrumental music
 Ludwig van Beethoven: 3 flute clock pieces as sonata for flute and organ (2nd version with piano)
 Johannes Brahms: Herzlich tut mich verlangen for 4 cellos
 Johannes Brahms: Fugue in A flat minor for 4 cellos
 Johann Baptist Georg Neruda: Concert for Trumpet and organ
 Max Reger: Adagio from the cello solo suite, arranged for 4 cellos
 Christian Heinrich Rinck: Flute concerto for flute and organ
 Gioachino Rossini: Fantasy for clarinet and organ
 Robert Schumann: 4 sketches for 2 pianos
 Louis Vierne: Clair de lune and Naiades for flute, strings and harp
 Lefébure-Wély: 4 pieces for 8 brass instruments
 Works by Mozart, Rossini, Vierne, Vivaldi, Gluck for flute and organ

Vocal music
 Felix Mendelssohn Bartholdy: Dominica il post Pascha for female voices, strings and organ
 Otto Nicolai: Ein feste Burg (for 4 trumpets, 4 trombones, four-part mixed choir, organ) (Verlag Strube)
 Max Reger: Requiem op. 144 for alto solo, choir and organ
 Louis Roessel: Kavatine for soprano, four-part mixed choir and organ (Verlag Helbling)
 Geistl. Songs by G. Bizet, A. Dvorak, H. Wolf and Max Reger for soprano, harp and organ 
 Sacred songs, Arias and duets (by Beethoven, Brahms, G. Fauré, C. Franck, Mendelssohn, Mozart) for soprano and organ 
 Sacred songs by Brahms, Beethoven, Wolf, Reger for soprano or baritone and chamber orchestra
Miscellaneous
 "Rag" for chamber orchestra
 "Communio" for flute and strings
 "Ohrensausen" (Gustav Meyrinck) Melodrama for narrator and piano

External links 
 
 Homepage von Harald Feller
 Discography (Discogs)
 Harald Feller - Toccata für Klavier (YouTube)

1951 births
Living people
Musicians from Munich
German classical organists
German male organists
20th-century German composers
Academic staff of the University of Music and Performing Arts Munich
21st-century organists
20th-century German male musicians
21st-century German male musicians
Oehms Classics artists
Male classical organists